El Guásimo is a corregimiento in Los Santos District, Los Santos Province, Panama with a population of 610 as of 2010. Its population as of 1990 was 645; its population as of 2000 was 555.

References

Corregimientos of Los Santos Province